The Mufulira Open was a men's professional golf tournament played at Mufulira Golf Club in Mufulira, Zambia between 1970 and 1984. It was one of three Zambian events on the Safari Circuit schedule.

The Mufulira Open was founded a year after the Lusaka Open, but pre-dated the Zambia Open which was first contested in 1972. There was no tournament in 1974, as Mufulira Golf Club hosted the Zambia Open. From 1976 the tournament was only played every other year, alternating with the Cock o' the North tournament.

An English golfer, David Moore, aged 22, was shot and killed during the 1976 tournament.

Winners

References

Safari Circuit events
Golf tournaments in Zambia
Recurring sporting events established in 1970
Recurring sporting events disestablished in 1984
1970 establishments in Zambia